Kostadin Stoyanov (born 2 May 1986) is a Bulgarian retired footballer who played as defender. Stoyanov is a central defender.

Career
Stoyanov began his football career playing for Sliven, before joined Chernomorets Burgas. Stoyanov made his B PFG debut on 21 August 2004, in Chernomorets's 1–0 defeat to Vihren Sandanski. In the summer of 2005 he joined Zagorets Nova Zagora.

In June 2007 he moved to OFC Sliven 2000. After a two good seasons in Sliven, on 24 June 2009, he signed a contract for 3 years with CSKA Sofia. He scored his first goal for the team on 20 September 2009 in the 2:0 win against Levski Sofia in The Eternal Derby of Bulgaria.

He retired from football in 2013 due to serious injury.

Two years later and after a special intervention, he came back from retirement with Vereya, but played with the second team most of the time. On 5 June 2016 Stoyanov scored 2 goals for Vereya II in the playoffs for V Group won by Vereya with 2-1. 

In the summer of 2016 he returned in the professional football by signing with Botev Plovdiv. But was released after just 3 games and he returned to play for his local amateur Vereya II.

On 25 June 2017 he signed with Sozopol. After 11 matches with the team, he retired once again in the end of the year.

International career
In June 2007 he participated with the team in the European Football Championship for amateurs - UEFA Regions' Cup in Bulgaria. On 26 June 2007 Stoyanov played in the final of the tournament, but Bulgaria lost the match against Poland with 1:2. On 2 October 2009 Stoyanov was called by the manager of the Bulgarian national football team Stanimir Stoilov for the matches against Cyprus and Georgia.

References

External links
 

1986 births
Living people
Sportspeople from Sliven
Bulgarian footballers
Bulgaria international footballers
First Professional Football League (Bulgaria) players
Second Professional Football League (Bulgaria) players
FC Chernomorets Burgas players
OFC Sliven 2000 players
PFC CSKA Sofia players
PFC Beroe Stara Zagora players
FC Vereya players
Botev Plovdiv players
FC Sozopol players
Association football defenders